Saint Amelberga of Susteren was the Benedictine abbess of Susteren Abbey, Netherlands in the 9th century AD; she died about 900 AD. Her remains are kept in the former abbey church in Susteren, which was dedicated to her in the 19th century. Her feast is celebrated on November 21.

Saint Amelberga of Susteren should not be confused with St. Amalberga of Maubeuge, or the virgin St. Amalberga of Temse.

See also
Susteren Abbey

References

Benedictine abbesses